Joazimar Sequeira Conceição, known as Joazimar Stehb (born 26 January 1991) is a Cape Verdean football player who plays for GD Fontinhas.

Club career
He made his professional debut in the Segunda Liga for Atlético CP on 8 August 2015 in a game against Freamunde.

References

External links
 
 

1991 births
People from São Nicolau, Cape Verde
Living people
Cape Verdean footballers
Cape Verde international footballers
Batuque FC players
Atlético Clube de Portugal players
S.C. Praiense players
Louletano D.C. players
Liga Portugal 2 players
Association football forwards